Alnur Aljapparuly Mussayev (Älnūr Äljapparūly Mūsaev; born 4 January 1954; Lugovoye, Lugovsky District, Dzhambul Region, Soviet Union) was the former head of Kazakhstan's National Security Committee (KNB) under the tenure of President Nursultan Nazarbayev. He served from  May 1997 to September 1998, then returned for a second term from August 1999 to May 2001 after his predecessor Nurtai Abykayev was sacked in a scandal over the sale of old MiG fighter planes to North Korea.

In 2007, Mussayev fled Kazakhstan along with his former deputy Rakhat Aliyev to Vienna, Austria.  Mussayev accused the government of widespread corruption and payments of millions of dollars in bribes by western oil companies to President Nazarbayev. The government of Kazakhstan has convicted him of crimes in absentia as a result of his defection.

An attempted kidnapping of Mussayev took place in Vienna in September 2008. The Austrian government declined comment on the perpetrators' origins at the time. In a January 2010 trial, defendant Ildar A., one of three men charged with the kidnap attempt on Mussayev, was found not guilty by an Austrian court. Mussayev described the verdict as "politically motivated" and an "attempt to please Kazakhstan". During the trial, Mussayev claimed not to know Ildar A., but he admitted in press comments soon after that this was not entirely accurate, as he knew the defendant professionally but not personally; he explained the discrepancy by claiming that his oath to Kazakhstan prevented him from revealing this information.

In 2015, Mussayev faced charges for the abduction and murder of two bankers in the Nurbank murder case. The primary suspect in the case, Rakhat Aliyev, was found hanged in his prison cell before the trial began. The trial was one of the most complex in Austrian history with over 60 witnesses. Mussayev was cleared of all changes. Vadim Koshlyak was cleared of murder, but sentenced to two years in prison.

Aisultan Nazarbaev (26 August 1990 – 16 August 2020), an outspoken critic of his grandfather Nursultan Nazarbayev and son of Rakhat Aliyev, stated that he did not inherit his father's wealth because his father's wealth was stolen by his mother Dariga Nazarbayeva and Alnur Mussayev also spelled Alnur Musaev.

References

Living people
Kazakhstani expatriates in Austria
Directors of intelligence agencies
1954 births